The Theban Tomb TT177 is located in El-Khokha, part of the Theban Necropolis, on the west bank of the Nile, opposite to Luxor.

TT177 was the burial place of the ancient Egyptian named Amenemopet, who was a scribe of truth in the Ramesseum in the estate of Amun. Amenemopet  lived during the reign of  Ramesses II during the  Nineteenth Dynasty of Egypt. He was the son of a man named Nebkhed, who was a scribe of the divine seal of the estate of Amun.

The tomb contains a hall which is decorated. Kitchen translates the titles of Amenemopet as lector of Amun in the Temple of Usimare Setepenre, and true scribe in the Temple of Usimare Setepenre in the Estate of Amun. Amenemopet's father, Nebqed, is said to be a scribe of the God's valuables of the Estate of Amun.

See also
 List of Theban tombs

References

Theban tombs
Nineteenth Dynasty of Egypt